St. Pauls is a town in the Canadian province of Newfoundland and Labrador. The town had a population of 202 in the Canada 2021 Census.

It is known as Uapashku Napaue by the Innu.

Demographics 

See also
 List of cities and towns in Newfoundland and Labrador

References

Towns in Newfoundland and Labrador